Marko Lipp (born 19 March 1999) is an Estonian professional footballer who currently plays as a centre-back for Meistriliiga club Flora and the Estonia national team.

International career
Lipp made his senior international debut for Estonia on 8 January 2023, in a 1–1 draw against Iceland in a friendly.

Honours

Club
FCI Levadia
Estonian Cup: 2017–18, 2020–21
Estonian Supercup: 2018

Flora
Meistriliiga: 2022

References

External links

1999 births
Living people
Footballers from Tallinn
Estonian footballers
Association football defenders
Esiliiga players
Meistriliiga players
FCI Levadia U21 players
FCI Levadia Tallinn players
Tartu JK Tammeka players
FC Flora players
Estonia youth international footballers
Estonia under-21 international footballers
Estonia international footballers